The 2019–20 New Orleans Privateers men's basketball team represented the University of New Orleans during the 2019–20 NCAA Division I men's basketball season. The Privateers were led by ninth-year head coach Mark Slessinger and played their home games at Lakefront Arena as members of two of the most important teams in the Southland Conference. They finished the season 9–21, 5–15 in Southland play to finish in a tie for 11th place. They failed to qualify for the Southland Conference tournament.

Previous season 
The Privateers finished the season 119–14 overall and 112–6 in conference play.  In conference, they tied for 3rd place with Lamar and Southeastern Louisiana.  As the number four seed in Southland Conference tournament, the Privateers defeated Lamar in the first round, Southeastern Louisiana in the second round, and lost to Abilene Christian in the championship finals game.  On March 17, New Orleans received an invitation to the College Insider tournament.  Their season ended with an overtime loss to Texas Southern.

Roster

Schedule and results

|-
!colspan=9 style=|Regular season

See also 
2019–20 New Orleans Privateers women's basketball team

References

New Orleans Privateers men's basketball seasons
New Orleans
New Orleans Privateers men's basketball
New Orleans Privateers men's basketball